Finisher may refer to:

 Finisher (wrestling), a move in professional wrestling
 The Finishers, a 2013 French film
 The Finisher (series), also known as Vega Jane, a book series by David Baldacci
 The Finisher (children's book), the first book in the series
 Finisher, a device for post-printing actions (stapling, hole-punching, folding, or collating) usually as a multi-function printer
 James Faulkner (cricketer), nicknamed "The Finisher" due to his ability to seal victories as a batsman

See also
 Finish (disambiguation)
 Finishing (disambiguation)